The New Hampshire Department of Health & Human Services (DHHS) is a state agency of the U.S. state of New Hampshire, headquartered in Concord. Providing services in the areas of mental health, developmental disability, substance abuse, and public health, it is the largest agency operated by the state.

Organization
The department is organized into several divisions:
 Division for Behavioral Health
 Division of Economic and Housing Stability
 Division of Long Term Supports and Services
 Division for Children, Youth, and Families
 Division of Public Health Services
 Division of Medicaid Services
 Division of Legal and Regulatory Services

The Division for Children, Youth, and Families includes the Bureau of Juvenile Justice Services, which operates the Sununu Youth Services Center (SYSC), a juvenile justice institution. Located in Manchester, SYSC opened in April 2006, and holds children aged 13 through 17.

Also structured within the department are:
 Office of the Commissioner
 Bureau of Quality Assurance and Improvement
 Program Planning and Integrity

References

External links

Health and Human Services
Medical and health organizations based in New Hampshire
State departments of health of the United States
State corrections departments of the United States
Juvenile detention centers in the United States